The DAF LF is a range of light/medium duty trucks produced by the British manufacturer Leyland Trucks. It is a redevelopment from the Leyland Roadrunner of 1984.

The LF45 and LF55 are powered by Cummins B Series engines. The distribution truck and pickup versions of the LF45 use the 4 cylinder, LF45s with powered equipment such as bin lorries and vacuum tankers use the 6 cylinder, and all LF55s use the 6 cylinder due to their increased size and weight. The LF shares its cab design with the Renault Midlum and the Volvo FL.  It is also the base for medium duty trucks for Kenworth and Peterbilt.

The LF won the International Truck of the Year 2002 award.

Gallery

LF Hybrid

In September 2010, DAF introduced a hybrid version of the LF45 at the IAA 2010 in Hannover. The LF Hybrid has a 118 kilowatt diesel engine combined with a 44 kW brushless electric motor, which has a permanent magnet and is placed in line between the clutch and the automatic transmission. The electric motor is powered by 96 lithium-ion batteries of 3.4 Volt each, weighing a total of 100 kg. The battery pack allows the truck to drive for about 2 kilometres with the diesel engine turned off and to store energy from braking for future use.

Notes

LF
LF
Vehicles introduced in 2001
Cab over vehicles